Seyed Taher Sabahi (born July 21, 1940) is an Iranian-born art dealer, journalist, author and lecturer born in Tehran.

Besides being a carpet dealer in Turin since 1961, in 1993 Taher Sabahi founded the quarterly magazine Ghereh, International Carpet & Textile Review, a quarterly magazine published in English and Italian. Since then he has been the editor of the magazine, and he has also been active in the publishing world, writing many books on carpets.

Life 
Born in Tehran to an Iranian Azerbaijan family, Sabahi moved to Rome in September 1961. Sabahi attended medical school in the University of Bologna's Faculty of Pharmacy. During 1972 he was recognized as an expert in Eastern (particularly Iranian) rugs and rug making.

Bibliography
Sabahi has written over twenty books about Iranian Carpets, some of these are listed below

– Tappeti d’oriente, arte e tradizione. De Agostini, Novara 1986

– Splendeurs du tapis d’orient. Atlas, Paris 1987

– Vaghireh. Modelli per la tessitura dei tappeti. Karta, Firenze 1987

– ABC del tappeto orientale. De Agostini, Novara 1989

– Qashqai. Tappeti tribali persiani. De Agostini, Novara 1989

– Kilim. Tappeti piani del Caucaso. De Agostini, Novara 1990

– Orienttepiche. Battenberg Verlag, Augsburg 1992

– Sumak. Tappeti piani a trama avvolta. De Luca, Roma 1992

– Tülü. Tappeti a pelo lungo dell’Anatolia centrale. CATO, Torino 1997

– Kerman.Cinque secoli di tappeti. Capricorno, Torino 2005

– L’arte del tappeto d’oriente. Electa – Mondadori, Milano 2007

– Kilim. Electa – Mondadori, Milano 2011   

– RoyalHunt. The Medallion Rug of the Poldi Pezzzoli Museum, Milan. (English-Italian) 2020 

Libri pubblicati in Iran:

– Qalin. Story and Art of rug weaving in Orient. (Persian)

  Published in two volumes, by Gooya house of culture and art, Tehran

– Qali e Iran. Persian Carpets. (Persian – English) Published by Gooya, Tehran.

– Kilim, Story and Art of flat weaving in Orient. (Persian) Published by Vijeh Nashr, Tehran

– Savarane Shargh – Knights of the Orient. (Persian – English) Published by Gooya, Tehran

– Shahsavan. (Persian – English) Published by Vijeh Nashr, Tehran

– Qashqai. (Persian – English) Published by Gooya, Tehran

– Kerman – Five Centuries of Carpets weaving in Kerman. (Persian – English) Published by Matn    

  “Farhanghestane Honar”, Tehran 

Cataloghi pubblicati in inglese – italiano:

– Cavalieri d’oriente. De Luca, Milano 1991

– Samarcanda. Tappeti della via della seta. Rumor, Vicenza 1995

– Cina. Tappeti antichi del celeste impero. Bolis Spa, Bergamo 1998

– Shahsavan Jajim. Musumeci editore, Aosta 1998

– Anatolia. “quivi si fanno li sovrani tappeti del mondo più begli”. Rumor, Vicenza 2000

– Tibet. Rugs of the Roof of the World. Ghereh publications, Torino 2001 

Memberships:

·       Academic Committee for the International Conference on Oriental Carpets (ICOC)

·       Rotary International, Turin

·       Member of the board of directors of the "Persian hand-knotted carpet Think Thank", Teheran

·       Expert and examining member of the Court of Turin, carpets and textiles section

References

People from Tehran
Iranian art dealers
1940 births
Iranian non-fiction writers
Iranian journalists
Living people
University of Bologna alumni
University of Turin alumni